Shirley Conran OBE (née Pearce; born 21 September 1932) is a British novelist and journalist.

Early life 
Born in 1932, she attended St. Paul's Girls' School, London, and then a finishing school in Switzerland, which later provided some inspiration for the fictional school ''L'Hirondelle' in her 1982 novel Lace. Her father was an alcoholic and her home life was difficult, causing Conran to leave home at 19. She worked as an artist's model, and then trained as a sculptor at Southern College of Art, Portsmouth (now part of Southampton University), and as a painter at Chelsea Polytechnic (now part of University of the Arts London).

Career
Following the breakdown of her first marriage, Conran turned to writing in order to support her children. She wrote for the Daily Mail and in 1968 became women's editor and launched Femail, the newspaper's first dedicated women's section. Writing in the Mail in 2018, Conran reflected that this was the first time women in British journalism were being allowed free reign to write about what interests them, given "newspapers had only ever included a woman's section about knitting, dress patterns, recipes and the odd interview with worthy charity organisers." For its pioneering work, Conran believes the first edition of "Femail" magazine should be in the Feminist Archives.

Conran later became women's editor for The Observer magazine, and wrote columns for Vanity Fair. Her influential 1975 non-fiction book Superwoman coined the phrase that became a feminist slogan: "Life's too short to stuff a mushroom."

Her first novel Lace was published in 1982 by Simon & Schuster and was a huge bestseller, spending 13 weeks on the New York Times Best Seller list, reaching as high as No. 6. It became known as a 'bonkbuster' for its many explicit and often bizarre sex scenes. It was adapted into a 1980s US miniseries starring Phoebe Cates. It contains the infamous line: "Which one of you bitches is my mother?"

Personal life
Conran was married to Sir Terence Conran from 1955 to 1962; they are the parents of two sons: Sebastian Orby Conran and Jasper Alexander Thirlby Conran, both designers. In 2009, she wrote that she suffered from chronic fatigue syndrome. Conran has homes in France and London, and lived in Monaco for several years. She founded the educational non-profit Maths Action.

Works

Fiction
Lace (Simon & Schuster, 1982) 
Lace 2 (1985)
The Complete Story (omnibus, 1986)
Savages (1987, movie rights owned by Warner Brothers but never made)
The Amazing Umbrella Shop (1990 - children's book co-authored with her children Jasper and Sebastian Conran)
Crimson (1992)
Tiger Eyes (1994)
The Revenge (aka Revenge of Mimi Quinn, 1998)

Non-fiction
Superwoman (1975), see Superwoman (sociology)
Superwoman 2 (1977)
Futurewoman: How to Survive Life After Thirty (1979)
Superwoman in Action (1979)
The Magic Garden (1983)
Down with Superwoman: For Everyone Who Hates Housework (1990)
Money Stuff (2014)

Other
The Magic Garden was adapted as a computer program and published by Acornsoft for the BBC Micro as Shirley Conran's Magic Garden.

References

External links
 Official website
 Sarah Hughes: 'What trashy novels taught me about life', Observer Books, 31 January 2021

1932 births
Living people
20th-century British novelists
20th-century English women writers
20th-century English writers
Alumni of the University of Portsmouth
English expatriates in Monaco
English journalists
English non-fiction writers
English novelists
English women journalists
English women non-fiction writers
English women novelists
Shirley